Expressway S1 or express road S1 is an expressway under construction in Poland with a planned length of , which is located in the Silesian and Lesser Poland voivodeships. Upon completion, it will connect the A1 motorway near the Katowice International Airport in Pyrzowice, with the A4 motorway and the border of Slovakia in Zwardoń, where it will connect to the D3 Motorway. A major part of the route is the Eastern beltway of Upper Silesian Industrial Region.

The route is expected to be completed by 2024.

Expressway route description

Pyrzowice-Tychy

Kosztowy-II-Bielsko-Biała 
As of the end of May 2016 there were 6 road options proposed, five of which were already available by June 2008.

At first option IV(D) was preferable. It had to go parallel to Brzeszcze – Oświęcim railway tracks. However, UNESCO protested against the choice, as, in their opinion, it would have crossed the quietness line around the former German concentration camp Auschwitz-Birkenau, and, as the result, UNESCO would have put the camp into the endangered list.

At the beginning of August 2009, the head of Miedźna commune has announced to media his option of the S1 (option VI), that would have gone on the borders of the Miedźna i Bojszowy communes, through the forest. In November 2009, it was accepted by all the local communes. However, GDDKiA rseignated from option VI because of environmental issues. The road would have passed through the "Stawy w Brzeszczach" reserve for birds conservation, which was not acceptable.

Option VI

Communes through which the road would have passed according to the option VI 
 Mysłowice (Kosztowy)
 Lędziny
 Bieruń
 Oświęcim (Stare Stawy)
 Brzeszcze
 Dankowice
 Stara Wieś
 Bielsko-Biała (Suchy Potok) In 2013 the Economical, Technical and Environmental Institution has proposed 4 choices (A, B, C, and D), of which choices A and C were preferred. However, the mining company "Brzeszcze" was against choice C, and "SILESIA" mining enterprise against A. As a compromise, GDDKIA promised to work on the additional option "E". Preparatory works for DŚU were done by 7 January 2015. In March 2015 choice "E" was chosen as preferred. In June the same year Regional Directorate of the Environment Protection in Katowice has asked GDDKiA to give out the environmental decision for the section.

Option V

Communes through which the road would have passed according to the option V 
 Mysłowice (Kosztowy)
 Lędziny
 Bieruń
 Międzyrzecze
 Gilowice
 Miedźna
 Bestwinka
 Kaniów
 Dankowice
 Stara Wieś
 Bielsko-Biała (Suchy Potok)
The project will cost approximately 1,437 bln złotych.

Interchanges 
 „Kosztowy II"(after construction the road to Tychy will br signed as S1A)
 „Lędziny"
 „Bieruń"
 „Oświęcim"(future connection to Oświęcim bypass)
 „Wola”
 „Brzeszcze"
 „Stara Wieś"
 „Suchy Potok"

4 options from 2012 
 Option A [39.7 km] would have run through the next communes:
 Mysłowice
 Lędziny
 Imielin
 Bieruń
 Bojszowy
 Miedźna
 Bestwina
 Wilamowice
 Bielsko-Biała
 Option B (40.4 km)would have run through the next communes:
 Mysłowice
 Lędziny
 Imielin
 Bieruń
 Bojszowy
 Oświęcim
 Bestwina
 Brzeszcze
 Wilamowice
 Bielsko-Biała
 Option C (40.8 km)would have run through the next communes:
 Mysłowice
 Lędziny
 Imielin
 Bieruń
 Bojszowy
 Oświęcim
 Bestwina
 Brzeszcze
 Wilamowice
 Bielsko-Biała
 Option D (42.1 km)would have run through the next communes:
 Mysłowice
 Lędziny
 Imielin
 Bieruń
 Bojszowy
 Oświęcim
 Bestwina
 Brzeszcze
 Wilamowice
 Bielsko-Biała.
In 2013 a new option, presented by the mining companies "SILESIA" and "Brzeszcze" and by Miedźna, Brzeszcze and Bestwina communes, was proposed. The option "H"(or hybrid), as it is known, was an initial compromise between the companies and communes and GDDKiA. It didn't come into life, however.

Bielsko-Biała-Zwardoń

Route description

See also 
European route E75

References 

Expressways in Poland